The Kirghiz Soviet Socialist Republic (Kirghiz SSR), also known as the Kyrgyz Soviet Socialist Republic (Kyrgyz SSR) or Kirgiz Soviet Socialist Republic (Kirgiz SSR), was one of the constituent republics of the Soviet Union (USSR) from 1936 to 1991. It was also known by the names Kyrgyzstan and Soviet Kyrgyzstan in the Kyrgyz language, and as Kirghizia and Soviet Kirghizia in the Russian language. Landlocked and mountainous, it bordered Tajikistan and China to the south, Uzbekistan to the west and Kazakhstan to the north. The Kirghiz branch of the Communist Party of the Soviet Union governed the republic from 1936 until 1990.

On 30 October 1990, the Kirghiz SSR was renamed to the Socialist Republic of Kyrgyzstan; on 15 December, after declaring its state sovereignty, it was renamed again to the Republic of Kyrgyzstan. On 31 August 1991, it transformed into independent Kyrgyzstan.

Etymology
The name "Kyrgyz" is believed to have been derived from the Turkic word for "forty", in reference to the forty clans of Manas, a legendary hero who united forty regional clans against the Uyghurs. The name "Kyrgyz" or "Kirghiz" means "Land of the forty tribes", combined from three words: kyrg (kyrk) meaning "forty", yz (uz) meaning "tribes" in East-Turkic, and -stan meaning "land" in Persian. Politically, the name of the republic was the Kirghiz Soviet Socialist Republic as stated in the 1937 and 1978 Constitutions of the Kirghiz SSR.

From 30 October 1990 to 15 December 1990, it was renamed the Socialist Republic of Kyrgyzstan (or Kirghizia). Afterwards, the "Socialist" prefix was dropped and it became the Republic of Kyrgyzstan. Officially, in Russian language, the name of the country in Kyrgyz language began to be used - Kyrgyzstan, instead of Russian - Kirghizia. Later, the official name of the state was changed to the Kyrgyz Republic, which retained this name after independence.

History

Established on 14 October 1924 as the Kara-Kirghiz Autonomous Oblast of the RSFSR, it was transformed into the Kirghiz ASSR (Kirghiz Autonomous Socialist Soviet Republic) on 1 February 1926, still being a part of the RSFSR. The borders were not divided by ethnic or linguistic lines, however.

On 5 December 1936, with the adoption of the 1936 Soviet Constitution, it became a separate constituent republic of the USSR as the Kirghiz Soviet Socialist Republic during the final stages of the national delimitation in the Soviet Union.

At the time of formation of Kirghizia, its territory was divided into districts. On November 21, 1939, five oblasts (regions) were created: Jalal-Abad, Issyk Kul, Osh, Tyan Shan, and Frunze Oblasts. In 1944, Talas Oblast was established from Frunze but was abolished in 1956. In 1959, Frunze, Issyk-Kul and Jalal-Abad oblasts were abolished. Frunze and Issyk-Kul became territories under direct republic jurisdiction while Jalal-Abad joined Osh. Tyan Shan was the last oblast to be abolished in 1962, and by this point, the rest of the republic with the exception of Osh was divided into districts of republican subordination. In 1970, Issyk-Kul and Naryn (formerly Tien Shan) were restored, and in 1980 so was Talas. In 1988, the Naryn and Talas oblasts were again abolished where the former was merged with Issyk-Kul while the later was merged with Osh. However, in 1990 they were restored and at the same time, Jalal-Abad and Chüy (formerly Frunze) were reestablished. These districts were particularly known for their heavy application of fertilizers after independence.

The Osh Massacre in 1990 undermined the position of the first secretary. That same year, on 15 December, the Kirghiz SSR was reconstituted as the Republic of Kyrgyzstan after declaring its sovereignty. On 17 March 1991, Kirghizia supported the Union preservation referendum with a 95.98% turnout.

However, this did not come to pass when the hardliners took control of Moscow for three days in August 1991. Askar Akayev, the first president, unequivocally condemned the putsch and gained fame as a democratic leader. The country declared its independence on 31 August 1991 and the Soviet Union was formally dissolved on 26 December 1991. However, the 1978 constitution remained in effect after its independence until 1993.

Politics

Similar to that of the Soviet republics, Kirghizia's government took place in the framework of a one-party socialist republic with the Communist Party of Kirghizia as the sole legal political party. The First Secretary of the Communist Party of Kirghizia served as the head of the party, while the Chairmen of the Presidium of the Supreme Soviet functioned as the executive head of state and the Chairmen of the Council of Ministers led the legislative branch.

Economy

Demographics
In 1926, the Kirghiz Soviet Socialist Republic had a population of 1,002,000 people. In 1939, 1,458,000 people were recorded. The population grew significantly in the decades after World War II; the republic had 2,065,837 people in 1959, 2,932,805 people in 1970, and 3,529,030 people in 1979. In the final Soviet census of 1989, the Kirghiz Soviet Socialist Republic had grown to 4,257,755 people.
The majority of the population were ethnic Kyrgyz people. However, because large numbers were sent here in deportations, at times there were significant other ethnic groups. Between March and May 1944 alone, it was reported in the Kremlin that 602,193 residents of the North Caucasus region had been deported to the Kirghiz and Kazakh SSRs, of which 496,460 were Chechens and Ingush, 68,327 of which were Karachai and 37,406 were Balkars. The majority of the Kyrgyz population were (as they are today) Muslims, speaking a Turkic language. Bishkek had the largest concentration of Russians in the country, some 22% of the population by independence, with Uzbek minorities in the Fergana Valley especially constituting some 13% of the population. In 1990, violent clashes between Uzbeks and Kyghyz peoples broke out in the Osh Raion; ethnic tension still remains in the region.

Religion

Under Soviet rule, Islam in Kirghizia was heavily suppressed with people actively encouraging atheism. Soviet authorities permitted limited religious activity in all the majority-Muslim Soviet republics. Most of the Russian population of Kirghizia were atheist or Russian Orthodox. After independence, the country enjoyed greater religious freedom and remains to this day a secular state.

Geography

Kirghizia, a landlocked republic in Soviet Central Asia shared its borders with Kazakhstan, Tajikistan and Uzbekistan as well as China on the outside lying between latitudes 39° and 44° N, and longitudes 69° and 81° E. It is farther from the sea than any other individual country, and all its rivers flow into closed drainage systems which do not reach the sea. The mountainous region of the Tian Shan covers over 80% of the country, with the remainder made up of valleys and basins.

Issyk-Kul Lake, or Ysyk-Köl in Kyrgyz, in the north-eastern Tian Shan is the largest lake in Kyrgyzstan and the second largest mountain lake in the world after Titicaca. The highest peaks are in the Kakshaal-Too range, forming the Chinese border. Heavy snowfall in winter leads to spring floods which often cause serious damage downstream. The runoff from the mountains is also used for hydro-electricity.

Culture

As the Soviet Union respected other cultures even after delimitation, there are a wide variety of cultural items in Kirghizia listed here:
 Manas, an epic poem
 Komuz, a three-stringed lute
 Tush kyiz, large, elaborately embroidered wall hangings
 Shirdak, flat cushions made in shadow-pairs
 Other textiles, especially made from felt
 Falconry

Traditions

Apart from celebrating the New Year each 1 January, Kirghizia, like all Soviet Republics, observed the Great October Socialist Revolution on 7 November. Its festivals and traditions such as Nowruz and Ulak Tartish were suppressed by the Soviet authorities.

The tradition of bride kidnapping, which remains illegal to this day, was suppressed by the Soviet regime. It is debatable whether bride kidnapping is actually traditional. Some of the confusion may stem from the fact that arranged marriages were traditional, and one of the ways to escape an arranged marriage was to arrange a consensual "kidnapping."

Legacy 

According to 2013 Gallup poll, 62% of Kyrgyz people say that the collapse of the Soviet Union harmed their country, while only 16% said that the collapse benefitted it. The poll also showed that well-educated Kyrgyz people were more likely to say that the breakup harmed their country.

See also 
 Leadership of Communist Kyrgyzstan
 Interhelpo

Notes

References

Further reading
 Fatland, E. (2020). Sovietistan: Travels in Turkmenistan, Kazakhstan, Tajikistan, Kyrgyzstan, and Uzbekistan. New York: Pegasus Books.

 
States and territories established in 1936
States and territories disestablished in 1991
1936 establishments in the Soviet Union
1991 disestablishments in the Soviet Union
Former socialist republics
Republics of the Soviet Union
Communism in Kyrgyzstan